Tribal is a Canadian television crime drama series, which premiered February 20, 2020 on APTN. The series stars Jessica Matten as Sam Woodburn, the newly appointed chief of an indigenous police force in the Nêhiyawak First Nation in Alberta, and Brian Markinson as Chuck “Buke” Bukansky, a racist and sexist white cop from Calgary whom she is paired with to solve crimes.

The cast also includes Adam MacDonald, Ryan Northcott, Julian Black Antelope, Garry Chalk, Justin Rain, Michelle Thrush, Glen Gould, John Cassini, Joel Oulette, Marika Sila, and Georgina Lightning.

The first season consists of eight episodes directed by Ron E. Scott. In advance of the series premiere, APTN announced that the show will have a second season. The second season of ten episodes premiered on October 21, 2021 and was directed by Ron E. Scott and Asaf Benny.

The series was filmed in Calgary, Alberta.

Premise
Following her predecessor's suspension due to allegations of corruption, Officer Sam Woodburn is appointed as the new interim Chief of the Justice Department's newly integrated Tribal Police Force. She is forced to partner up with Detective Chuck 'Buke' Bukansky who has a reputation for racism. Despite their conflicting views together they investigate crimes that involve or have direct links to the First Nations.

Cast
 Jessica Matten as Chief Samantha "Sam" Woodburn
 Brian Markinson as Detective Chuck “Buke” Bukansky
 Adam MacDonald as Detective Lucas Fielding
 Ryan Northcott as Detective Mitch Wheeler
 Julian Black Antelope as Daniel Crowchild
 Garry Chalk as Constance "Connie" Edwin Harris
 Justin Rain as Ryan Streit-(Season 1)
 Michelle Thrush as Jackie Woodburn-(Season 1)
 Glen Gould as Gordon Thundercloud-(Season 1)
 John Cassini as Jimmy Ganz-(Season 1-Season 2)
 Ana Rice as Officer Tara Whitetail-(Season 1)

Episodes

Series Overview

Season 1 (2020)

Season 2 (2021)

Reception
In his year-end review of television in 2020, critic John Doyle of The Globe and Mail singled out both Markinson and Matten as having given two of the year's best performances in Canadian television.

References

External links

2020 Canadian television series debuts
2020s Canadian crime drama television series
Aboriginal Peoples Television Network original programming
Television shows filmed in Calgary
First Nations television series